Cuartero, officially the Municipality of Cuartero (Capiznon/Hiligaynon: Banwa sang Cuartero), is a 4th class municipality in the province of Capiz, Philippines. According to the 2020 census, it has a population of 27,993 people.

Geography

Barangays
Cuartero is politically subdivided into 22 barangays.

Climate

Demographics

Economy

References

External links
 [ Philippine Standard Geographic Code]
Philippine Census Information

Municipalities of Capiz